Arthur Franklin Earley (September 4, 1925 – June 9, 1981) was an American politician who served as a Republican member of the Pennsylvania House of Representatives from the 159th district from 1979 to 1981.  He was the first black member elected to the Pennsylvania House of Representatives from the 159th district.  He was among the first African Americans to serve in the United States Marine Corps and was a founder of the Montford Point Marine Association.

Early life and education
Earley was born in Lynchburg, Virginia.  He received an A.B. from Howard University, attended American University and received an LL.B from Temple University Law School.

He served in World War II in the United States Marine Corps from 1943 to 1946.

In 1965, Earley was a legal advisor to the creation of the Montford Point Marine Association, a non-profit, military veteran organization founded to memorialize the legacy of the first African Americans to serve in the United States Marine Corps.  Earley was accepted into the Montford Point Marine Association Hall of Fame posthumously in 1999.

Career
Earley served as the assistant district attorney for Delaware County, Pennsylvania from 1971 to 1978.  He was elected to the Pennsylvania House of Representatives from the 159th district for the 1979 and 1981 terms.

Earley was a member of the Delaware County bar association, Phi Beta Sigma fraternity, Phi Alpha Delta legal fraternity and the NAACP.

He died of a heart attack in office in 1981 and was succeeded by Robert C. Wright.

References

1925 births
1981 deaths
20th-century American lawyers
20th-century American politicians
African Americans in World War II
African-American state legislators in Pennsylvania
United States Marine Corps personnel of World War II
Howard University alumni
Republican Party members of the Pennsylvania House of Representatives
Temple University alumni
United States Marines
20th-century African-American politicians
African-American men in politics
African-American United States Navy personnel